The 2012–13 Rubin season was the ninth successive season that the club played in the Russian Premier League, the highest tier of association football in Russia. In addition the domestic league, the club competed in this season's editions of the Russian Cup (as title holders), the Russian Super Cup, and the Europa League.

Squad

Out on loan

Reserves

Transfers

Summer

In:

 

Out:

Winter

In:

Out:

Competitions

Russian Premier League

League table

Matches

Russian Cup

Russian Super Cup

UEFA Europa League

Group stage

Notes
Note 1: Neftchi Baku played their home match at Dalga Arena, Baku as their own Ismat Gayibov Stadium did not meet UEFA criteria.

Knockout phase

Round of 32

Round of 16

Quarter-finals

Notes
Note 1: Rubin Kazan played their home match at Luzhniki Stadium, Moscow instead of their regular stadium, Tsentralnyi Stadion, Kazan.

Squad statistics

Appearances

|-
|colspan="14"|Players away from the club on loan:

|-
|colspan="14"|Players who left Rubin Kazan during the season:

|}

Goal scorers

Clean sheets

Disciplinary record

References

FC Rubin Kazan seasons
Rubin Kazan
Rubin Kazan